Paul Abbott (born 25 October 1964) is a former Australian rules footballer who played with Hawthorn and Fitzroy in the VFL/AFL.

Abbott was a versatile player who could be used in both the ruck and key positions. He was a member of two Hawthorn premiership sides and kicked six goals in their 1988 Grand Final win over Melbourne.

A broken leg suffered during the 1989 season meant he didn't play at all in 1990 and in 1991 he crossed to Fitzroy where he finished his career.

References

Hawk Headquarters profile

1964 births
Living people
Hawthorn Football Club players
Hawthorn Football Club Premiership players
Fitzroy Football Club players
Morwell Football Club players
Australian rules footballers from Victoria (Australia)
Two-time VFL/AFL Premiership players